Mehdi Seyyed Anayt (also Romanized as Mehdī Seyyed ʿAnāyt) is a village in Shoaybiyeh-ye Sharqi Rural District, Shadravan District, Shushtar County, Khuzestan Province, Iran. At the 2006 census, its population was 449 in 77 families.

References 

Populated places in Shushtar County